Varvara Asenkova (1817 – 1841), was a Russian stage actress.  She was engaged at the Imperial Theatres in 1835-1841, during which she had a successful career and referred to as the elite of her profession of her generation, noted particularly in heroine parts.

References

1817 births
1841 deaths
19th-century actresses from the Russian Empire
Russian stage actresses
Burials at Tikhvin Cemetery